Titinga Frédéric Pacéré (born 1943) is a Burkinabé solicitor, writer, poet and griot and founder and curator of the Musée de Manega museum in Burkina Faso. He studied in Abidjan. He has written over twenty books and published 60 volumes and has been awarded the medal of honour of the Association of French speaking writers (A.D.E.L.F.).

He was awarded the 1982 Grand Prix Littéraire d'Afrique Noire for two of his works, Poèmes pour l'Angola (1982) and La Poésie des griots (1982). Other works include Refrains sous le Sahel (1976), Quand s'envolent les grues couronnées (1976), and Du lait pour une tombe (1984).

Works

Literature
 Ça tire sous le Sahel 1976
 Refrains sous le Sahel 1976
 Quand s'envolent les grues couronnées 1976
 La poésie des griots 1983
 Poème pour l'Angola 1983
 Poème pour Koryo 1986
 Livre, culture et développement 1989
 Des entrailles de la terre 1990
 Dim-Dolobsom 
 La Bendrologie ou la science du langage tambouriné 
 Bendr'N Gomdé 
 Le langage des tam-tams et des masques en Afrique 1992
 Saglego, la poésie du tam-tam 1994

Essays and art related publications
 Problématique de l'aide aux pays sous-développés 1976
 Ainsi on a assassiné tous les Mossé 1979
 L'artisan du Burkina 1987
 Les Yakouga ou pierre tombales du Burkina 1993

Sociology and laws
 La famille voltaïque en crise 1976
 L'avortement et la loi 1983
 Les enfants abandonnés 1990
 Les personnes handicapées 1990

Ainsi on a assassiné tous les Mossé
The English translation of the book's title is So they murdered all Mossi people. It was first edited in 1979 by Naaman Editions (Canada) and re-edited in 1994 by Edition Fondation Pacere.

This essay describes the "anti-history" principle, one of the main ones guiding the design of Mossi people's society and the destruction of their civilization along with colonization.

Simply stated, anti-history consists of acknowledging that human societies' goal is to make people live happily. When a society can use acquired resources to perpetuate a steady state of fulfillment, it must stop trying to get more (because that would result in disequilibrium) and perpetuate the means and forces that maintain that society in that steady state. Then, the society will have to work against changes and against time to maintain the equilibrium over generations: That is the origin of the term "anti-history".

Anti-history and equilibrium are the very core principles of the Mossi civilization which as said in Ainsi on a assassiné tous les Mossé no longer effectively exists.

References

Burkinabé lawyers
Burkinabé writers
Burkinabé poets
Burkinabé historians
1943 births
Living people
20th-century poets
20th-century historians
21st-century Burkinabé people